Daniel Graovac (born 8 August 1993) is a Bosnian professional footballer who plays as a centre-back for Süper Lig club Kasımpaşa.

He started out at Zrinjski Mostar in 2013, and went on to compete professionally in Belgium, Serbia, Romania and Turkey.

In 2016, Graovac recorded his debut for the Bosnia and Herzegovina national team.

International career
Graovac made his first international appearance for Bosnia and Herzegovina in a friendly game against Luxembourg on 25 March 2016, having substituted Sanjin Prcić in the 77th minute. He made his official senior debut for them in a March 2016 friendly match away against Switzerland and has earned a total of 3 caps, scoring no goals. His last international was a January 2018 friendly against Mexico.

Career statistics

Club

International

Honours
Zrinjski Mostar
Premijer Liga: 2013–14, 2015–16, 2016–17

Željezničar
Bosnian Cup: 2017–18

Astra Giurgiu
Cupa României runner-up: 2020–21

CFR Cluj
Liga I: 2021–22
Supercupa României runner-up: 2021, 2022

Individual
Bosnian Premier League Team of the Season: 2017–18

References

External links

1993 births
Living people
People from Novi Grad, Bosnia and Herzegovina
Croats of Bosnia and Herzegovina
Association football central defenders
Bosnia and Herzegovina footballers
Bosnia and Herzegovina international footballers
HŠK Zrinjski Mostar players
Royal Excel Mouscron players
FK Željezničar Sarajevo players
FK Vojvodina players
FC Astra Giurgiu players
CFR Cluj players
Kasımpaşa S.K. footballers
Premier League of Bosnia and Herzegovina players
Belgian Pro League players
Serbian SuperLiga players
Liga I players
Süper Lig players
Bosnia and Herzegovina expatriate footballers
Bosnia and Herzegovina expatriate sportspeople in Belgium
Expatriate footballers in Belgium
Bosnia and Herzegovina expatriate sportspeople in Serbia
Expatriate footballers in Serbia
Bosnia and Herzegovina expatriate sportspeople in Romania
Expatriate footballers in Romania
Expatriate footballers in Turkey
Bosnia and Herzegovina expatriate sportspeople in Turkey